Walsh Public School (formerly known as Walsh Area Public School) is a French immersion dual-track public elementary school located in the hamlet of Walsh in the municipality of Norfolk County, Ontario, Canada.

Summary

History
Walsh Area Public School was constructed in 1959 on an open-field site along the north side of St. John's Road, between the Turkey Point Road and Young's Creek. It opened in March 1960, merging four one- and two-room elementary schools within five miles of the village: Walsh, Tisdale, Elmwood and McKnight. Education Minister and future Premier John Robarts attending the official opening in September 1960. The school was expanded in three phases over the next 15 years. It also had its name shortened to Walsh Public School.

The children of Walsh Public School were involved in an attempt to break the Guinness World Record for reading on January 26, 2009.

Culture
The name of the Walsh Public School athletic teams is the Whirlwinds (previously called the Wolverines in the 1990s). The school competes in basketball, baseball, soccer and track and field (through intramural events and the county meet in Port Dover).

References

External links

Elementary schools in Norfolk County, Ontario
Educational institutions in Canada with year of establishment missing